Pelé was a Brazilian football player who represented the Brazil national football team as a forward from 1957 to 1971. Along with Neymar, he is the all-time joint-top goalscorer for Brazil with 77 international goals, which he scored in 92 appearances. His first goal came in his debut game against Argentina, the only goal of Brazil in a 1–2 defeat in Maracanã Stadium, Rio de Janeiro, Brazil. 12 of those goals came during his 14 FIFA World Cup appearances, including six in his first World Cup in 1958, and four in his last World Cup in 1970. Pelé is one of the five players, along with Uwe Seeler, Miroslav Klose, Cristiano Ronaldo, and Lionel Messi, who have scored in four separate World Cups.

International appearances and goals 

Source:

Non-full International appearances

Playing for national teams

Playing for club teams

Sources:

FIFA World Cup goals 

Source:

Statistics

Source:

Source:

Hat-tricks

Source:

References

External links

Internaional Goals
Pele
Pele
Association football player non-biographical articles